Victor Ivanovich Cherkashin (born 22 February 1932) is a former Soviet foreign counter-intelligence officer of the PGU KGB SSSR.  He was the case officer for both Aldrich Ames, a CIA counter-intelligence officer, and Robert Hanssen, an FBI agent.

Career
Cherkashin joined the KGB in 1952 and retired in 1991. He was the case officer for both Aldrich Ames, a CIA counter-intelligence officer, and Robert Hanssen, an FBI agent, when they spied for the Soviet Union. Cherkashin served for many years in the KGB's First Chief Directorate, the department dedicated to foreign counter-intelligence. His career included tours in Lebanon, India, Australia, West Germany and Washington, DC.

Cherkashin was awarded the Order of Lenin in August 1986 for recruiting Aldrich Ames.

In 2004 he presented the book Spy Handler at the Spy Museum in Washington, DC.

Personal life
Cherkashin was the son of a NKVD officer. He received a diploma of a railway engineer from the Moscow State Institute of Railway Engineering.

Cherkashin married KGB cipher clerk Elena, with whom he has two children; Alyosha and Alyona. After his retirement from the KGB he established his own private security company in Moscow, where he now lives with Elena.

Victor and his wife Elena made an appearance on Anthony Bourdain: No Reservations on the Travel channel. He discussed a little about life as a spy and handler but also showed him helping Anthony pick wild mushrooms and then having his wife cook them and share stories while snacking. The show took place at his dacha, country house in a community with other retired KGB officers.

References

Bibliography 
 Cherkashin, Victor. (2004). Spy Handler: Memoir of a KGB Officer. The True Story of The Man Who Recruited Robert Hanssen & Aldrich Ames Basic. .

1932 births
Living people
People from Prokhorovsky District
Soviet colonels
KGB officers
Recipients of the Order of Lenin